ABC Gold Coast (ACMA callsign: 4ABCRR) is an ABC Local Radio station.  Based in the suburb of Mermaid Beach, the station broadcasts to the Gold Coast and surrounding hinterland in Queensland, covering as far south as Byron Bay in New South Wales.

The station started life in 1952 as 4SO, operating as a relay from Toowoomba of the ABC Regional Network, transmitting on a frequency of 1590 kHz (changed in 1978 to 1593 kHz to fit in with the revised 9 kHz spacing).

Its persona changed dramatically in 1983 when it was branded as 1593AM 4SO Gold Coast Rock to target the youth market, then became 91.7 ABC Coast FM when it began broadcasting on the FM band in 1989. The station is now a news, current affairs and adult contemporary music station. In 2013 the station changed its name to 91.7 ABC Gold Coast in alignment with the nomenclature used for other ABC Local Radio stations across Australia. In 2019, the frequency was dropped from the stations name, in alignment with other ABC Local Radio stations across Australia.

References

See also
 List of radio stations in Australia

Gold Coast
Radio stations on the Gold Coast, Queensland
Radio stations established in 1988